Theodora Palaiologina Synadene was the daughter of Constantine Palaiologos and Irene Komnene Laskarina Branaina. Through her father, she was a half-niece of the Byzantine Emperor Michael VIII Palaiologos.

Early life

Both of Theodora's parents died when she was young and unmarried, after which time she was brought up under the guardianship of her paternal half-uncle, the emperor Michael VIII.

Marriage and children

Sometime after being taken in by her half-uncle, Theodora was married to a Byzantine noble named John Angelos Doukas Synadenos, by whom she had three children:

 Euphrosyne Synadene. A nun.
 Theodore Synadenos. Protostrator. Married Eudokia Muzakiaina (A picture of Theodore and his wife can be seen here).
 John Synadenos. Megas Konostaulos. Married Thomais Komnene Doukaina Laskarina Kantakouzene Palaiologina.

Later life

It was not long after the death of her husband that Theodora decided to create the convent of Bebaia Elpis ("Sure Hope") in Constantinople, bringing her daughter, Euphrosyne, along with her. Sometime in the 14th century, she wrote the Typicon of Bebaia Elpis

The exact year of Theodora's death is unknown, though it was certainly in the 14th century.

Footnotes

References
 'Typikon of Theodora Synadene for the Convent of the Mother of God Bebaia Elpis in Constantinople' (trans. Alice-Mary Talbot) from Byzantine Monastic Foundation Documents: A Complete Translation of the Surviving Founder's Typika and Testaments, Thomas, J. & Hero, A.C. (eds.) (Dumbarton Oaks Research Library and Collection, Washington D.C. 2000) 
 Thomas, J. & Hero, A.C., Byzantine Foundation Documents (Dumbarton Oaks Research Library and Collection, Washington D.C. 2000)

Theodora
Greek women of the Byzantine Empire
13th-century Byzantine people
14th-century Byzantine people
Year of birth unknown
Year of death unknown
Theodora